Leopold III (1073 – 15 November 1136), known as Leopold the Good, was the Margrave of Austria from 1095 to his death in 1136. He was a member of the House of Babenberg. He was canonized on 6 January 1485 and became the patron saint of Austria, Lower Austria, Upper Austria and Vienna. His feast day is 15 November.

Biography
Leopold was born at Babenberg castle in Gars am Kamp, the son of Margrave Leopold II and Ida of Formbach-Ratelnberg. The Babenbergs had come to Austria from Bavaria where the family had risen to prominence in the 10th century. He grew up in the diocese of Passau under the influence of the reformer bishop Altmann of Passau. 

In 1096 Leopold succeeded his father as margrave of Austria at the age of 23. He married twice. His first wife, who died in 1105, may have been one of the von Perg family. The following year he married Agnes, the widowed sister of Emperor Henry V whom he had supported against her father Henry IV. This connection to the Salians raised the importance of the House of Babenberg, to which important royal rights over the margraviate of Austria were granted. Also, Agnes had influential connections through her previous marriage to Frederick of Hohenstaufen, one of her sons being Conrad III of Germany.

Leopold called himself "Princeps Terræ", a reflection of his sense of territorial independence. He was considered a candidate in the election of the Kaiser of the Holy Roman Empire in 1125, but declined this honour.

He is mainly remembered for the development of the country and, in particular, the founding of several monasteries. His most important foundation is Klosterneuburg (1108). According to legend, the Virgin Mary appeared to him and led him to a place where he found the veil of his wife Agnes, who had lost it years earlier. He established the Klosterneuburg Monastery there. He subsequently expanded the settlement to become his residence.

Leopold also founded the monasteries of Heiligenkreuz, Kleinmariazell and Seitenstetten which developed a territory still largely covered by forest. All of these induced the church to canonize him in 1485.

Leopold also fostered the development of cities, such as Klosterneuburg, Vienna and Krems. The last one was granted the right to mint but never attained great importance.

The writings of Henry of Melk and Ava of Göttweig, which are the first literary texts from Austria, date back to Leopold's time.

He is buried in the Klosterneuburg Monastery, which he founded. His skull is kept in an embroidered reliquary, which leaves the forehead exposed; it also wears an archducal hat.

In 1663, under the rule of his namesake Emperor Leopold I, he was declared patron saint of Austria instead of Coloman of Stockerau.

The brothers Joseph and Michael Haydn, each of whom sang in the choir of St. Stephen's Cathedral, both sang in that capacity at Klosterneuburg on this day. Joseph Haydn later became the more famous composer of the two. Michael Haydn later (in 1805) wrote a mass in honour of Leopold, the Missa sub titulo Sancti Leopoldi.

Since the death of Emperor Leopold I, the King's Feast is celebrated in Belgium on Leopold's feast day.

Children
His first marriage, possibly to a lady of the von Perg family, was childless.

By his second wife, Agnes of Germany, widow of Frederick I, Duke of Swabia:
 Adalbert
 Leopold IV ( 1108 – 1141)
 Henry II Jasomirgott (1107–1177)
 Berta, m. Henry III, Burgrave of Regensburg
 Agnes (c. 1108/13 – c. 1160/63), m. Władysław II of Poland
 Ernst
 Uta, wife of Liutpold von Plain
 Otto of Freising (c. 1114 – 1158), bishop and biographer of his nephew (from his mother's first marriage), Emperor Frederick I Barbarossa
 Conrad, Bishop of Passau and Archbishop of Salzburg
 Elisabeth, m. Hermann II of Winzenburg
 Judith, m. William V of Montferrat
 Gertrude, m. Duke (later King) Vladislaus II of Bohemia
According to the Continuation of the Chronicles of Klosterneuburg, there may have been up to seven others (possibly from multiple births) stillborn or who died in infancy.

In 2013, documentation regarding the results of DNA testing of the remains of the family buried in Klosterneuburg Abbey strongly favor that Adalbert was the son of Leopold and Agnes.

Gallery

See also

 List of rulers of Austria

References
Citations

Bibliography

External links

 Leopold III., Heiliger, Babenberger-Markgraf at AEIOU
 Leopold at Patron Saints Index

Leopold 3 of Austria (Babenberg)
Leopold 3 of Austria (Babenberg)
11th-century margraves of Austria
12th-century margraves of Austria
12th-century Christian saints
Austrian Roman Catholic saints
German Roman Catholic saints
People from Melk
Roman Catholic royal saints
Founders of Christian monasteries